Yeylaqi-ye Lakeh (also Romanized as Yeylāqī-ye Lākeh; also known as  Lākeh, Lākeh Yeylāqī, and Lakekh) is a village in Rostamabad-e Jonubi Rural District, in the Central District of Rudbar County, Gilan Province, Iran. At the 2006 census, its population was 30, in 10 families.

References 

Populated places in Rudbar County